John Proby Osborne, MP (1755 – December 1787) was an Irish politician.

Biography
Osborne was the son of Sir William Osborne, 8th Baronet and wife Elizabeth Christmas. He was a practising barrister and sat as a Member of Parliament in the Irish House of Commons for Carysfort between 1783 and 1788.

He died unmarried and childless.

Sources
 G.E. Cokayne; with Vicary Gibbs, H.A. Doubleday, Geoffrey H. White, Duncan Warrand and Lord Howard de Walden, editors, The Complete Peerage of England, Scotland, Ireland, Great Britain and the United Kingdom, Extant, Extinct or Dormant, new ed., 13 volumes in 14 (1910–1959; reprint in 6 volumes, Gloucester, U.K.: Alan Sutton Publishing, 2000), volume III, page 71.
 Charles Mosley, editor, Burke's Peerage, Baronetage & Knightage, 107th edition, 3 volumes (Wilmington, Delaware, U.S.A.: Burke's Peerage (Genealogical Books) Ltd, 2003), volume 2, page 3031.

External links
 http://www.thepeerage.com/p31476.htm#i314752

1755 births
Younger sons of baronets
Irish MPs 1783–1790
1787 deaths
Members of the Parliament of Ireland (pre-1801) for County Wicklow constituencies